Anthony Robert Dorigo (born 31 December 1965) is a former professional footballer, sports pundit and co-commentator.

As a player, he was a defender from 1983 to 2001. He had lengthy spells in the old First Division for both Aston Villa and Chelsea before signing with Leeds United in 1991 where he won the title and went on to feature in the Premier League from 1992 to 1997. He later had spells in Serie B with Torino before returning to top-flight English football with Derby County. He retired in the Football League with Stoke City in 2001. Despite being born and raised in Australia, he represented the England national team receiving 15 caps. He was also capped at England U21 and England B team level.

Since retirement, Dorigo has worked in the media and has worked as a pundit and commentator for Eurosport, Bravo, Channel 5, ESPN and Sky Sports, amongst others.

Early life
Dorigo was born in Melbourne, Victoria, Australia to an Italian father and an Australian mother. The family soon moved to Adelaide, South Australia, where Dorigo was raised. He played youth football for teams in the area, as well as age-group football for South Australia, and in his mid-teens was training with Adelaide City's first team. Dorigo wrote to 14 top-flight clubs in England and asked for a trial. Aston Villa were the first club to respond and offered him a four-day trial which proved successful.

Club career

He made his league debut for Aston Villa against Ipswich in 1984 as an 18-year-old and went on to win the club's Player of the Year award during his time at Villa Park.

He signed for Chelsea from Aston Villa for £475,000 and won the club's Player of the Year award in his first season, although the team were relegated. He helped Chelsea win promotion back to the First Division at the first attempt. However, he left Chelsea in somewhat acrimonious circumstances in the summer of 1991, having made and then withdrawn a transfer request, and then apparently having fallen out with manager Bobby Campbell after being dropped from the side due to declining a new contract. He was sold to Leeds United for £1.3 million. He made 180 appearances for Chelsea, scoring 11 goals.

Dorigo won the First Division Championship with Leeds in his first season at the club, as well as winning the supporters' Player of the Year award in the same year. He stayed with the club until 1997, when he joined Italian side Torino. At Torino he helped the club reach the promotion play-offs, as well as being awarded the club's Player of the Year, despite missing a penalty in the play-off final.

Due to financial reasons, Torino were forced to release him, with Dorigo ending his playing career with two years at Derby County. He scored three goals during his spell at Derby, with one in the league against Nottingham Forest and two in the FA Cup against Huddersfield Town, one in the original tie and again in the replay. He spent a final season at Stoke City, where he was made club captain, before retiring in 2001 at the age of 35. In his final season he played in Division Two (the third tier of the English senior leagues).

International career

Dorigo was initially called up by Australia for the 1986 World Cup qualifying campaign. However Aston Villa manager Tony Barton refused Dorigo permission to travel. Barton felt that playing for Australia would be a waste of time for Dorigo as their opponents were generally weaker opposition from Oceania.

The Football Association approached Dorigo to represent England: "England came along and asked me to play for them if I hung around for another year and got my British citizenship," says Dorigo. "My father was Italian and my mother was Australian, so 
I have no English parentage at all. What I say to my English friends today is that 'you lot were so bad you needed an Aussie to come and play for you!' It was very different back then to what it is now – the players in the Premier League today fly all over the world to play for their countries. They just did not allow that to happen in my day."

Dorigo later made seven appearances for the England B team and 11 for the England under-21s before going to earn 15 England caps. He made his debut in 1989 against Yugoslavia. A year earlier he was a surprise inclusion in the squad for the European Championships as cover for Kenny Sansom, after regular deputy Stuart Pearce withdrew through injury. Dorigo was also part of the 1990 World Cup squad. He played in the third place play-off defeat to hosts Italy, providing the cross for David Platt to score the temporary equaliser; England eventually lost the match 2–1, however.

Media career
Since retiring he has been a football pundit with various TV and radio networks starting with ITV Digital covering the Championship in 2001–02. He has since worked with Radio Aire covering Leeds United's Premier League campaign as well as TV punditry for Eurosport, Bravo, Channel 5, ESPN and Sky amongst others. He appeared on the James Corden Show on 16 June prior to the England and Germany second round match of the World Cup 2010.

His regular TV work includes La Liga, Serie A and Internationals for Al Jazeera as well as commentating for ESPN. He also commentates for Absolute Radio as part of their live Barclays Premier League coverage as well as appearing a number of times on BBC Radio 5 Live show Fighting Talk.

Career statistics

Club

A.  The "Other" column constitutes appearances and goals in the Full Members Cup, Football League play-offs, and Football League Trophy.

International

Honours
Chelsea
 Football League Second Division: 1988–89
 Full Members Cup: 1990

Leeds United
 Football League First Division: 1991–92
 FA Charity Shield: 1992

Individual
PFA Team of the Year: 1988–89 Second Division, 1992–93 Premier League

See also
 List of England international footballers born outside England

References

External links
 OzFootball Profile

1965 births
Living people
Soccer players from Melbourne
English footballers
England international footballers
England B international footballers
England under-21 international footballers
Australian soccer players
Australian emigrants to England
Association football fullbacks
Aston Villa F.C. players
Chelsea F.C. players
Leeds United F.C. players
Torino F.C. players
Derby County F.C. players
Stoke City F.C. players
Premier League players
Serie B players
UEFA Euro 1988 players
1990 FIFA World Cup players
UEFA Euro 1992 players
Australian people of Italian descent
English people of Italian descent
English Football League players
Australian expatriate soccer players
Australian expatriate sportspeople in England
Expatriate footballers in England
English expatriate sportspeople in Italy
Australian expatriate sportspeople in Italy
Expatriate footballers in Italy
Soccer players from Adelaide
Naturalised citizens of the United Kingdom